Joakim Eskildsen (born 1971) is a Danish art photographer.

Career as a photographer 

Eskildsen born 1971 in Copenhagen. He was a pupil of Rigmor Mydtskov in Copenhagen and went to Finland in 1994 to study photographic book making with Pentti Sammallahti at the University of Art and Design Helsinki. He lives near Copenhagen and has shown some of his works in Europe (including Germany, Denmark, Finland, Sweden, France, England, Italy), China, and South Africa.

From 2000-2006, together with the writer Cia Rinne, Eskildsen sought out Romani in various (mainly Eastern European) countries and other ethnic groups in India who are possibly related to the Roma. The fruits of this work have found their way into the book The Roma Journeys, which delivers insight into the life of the Roma by its text and more than 200 photographs.

Awards 

 Photo-Eye Books & Print Annual Award, 2000 (Best Foreign Title, for iChickenMoon)
 Amilcare Ponchielli Prize, 2008
 Deutscher Fotobuchpreis, 2009 (Gold, for The Roma Journeys)
 Prize of the Otto Pankok Foundation, 2009 (for The Roma Journeys)
 David Octavius Hill Medal, 2009 (by the Deutsche Fotografische Akademie)

Publications 

 Nordtegn / Nordic Signs. Opus 29. Helsinki: Taideteollinen Korkeakoulu, Valokuvataiteen laitos, 1995. .  
 Meknès (1997)
 Traer (1997)
 Blue Tide: A True Story / Maré Azul: uma história verdadeira. Opus 33. Helsinki: Taideteollinen Korkeakoulu, Valokuvataiteen laitos, 1997. .  With Cia Rinne.
 A Voyage to iChickenMoon. Suomen valokuvataiteen museon julkaisuja, 7. Helsinki: Suomen Valokuvataineen Museo (Finnish Museum of Photography), 1999. . Includes CD. With Cia Rinne and Sebastian Eskildsen. "Part of Shuttle 99, a Nordic-South African cultural exchange"; "Opus 38".
 al-Madina (with Pentti Sammallahti and Kristoffer Albrecht, 2002)
 The Roma Journeys. Göttingen: Steidl, 2007. .  Text: Cia Rinne. Preface: Günter Grass. 
 Roma-rejserne. Copenhagen: Kunsthallen Nikolaj, 2007. 
 Die Romareisen. Göttingen: Steidl, 2009. .

References

External links 

 

1971 births
21st-century Danish photographers
Danish photographers
Living people
Photographers from Copenhagen